Ogden  is a city in and the county seat of Weber County, Utah, United States, approximately  east of the Great Salt Lake and  north of Salt Lake City. The population was 87,321 in 2020, according to the US Census Bureau, making it Utah's eighth largest city. The city served as a major railway hub through much of its history, and still handles a great deal of freight rail traffic which makes it a convenient location for manufacturing and commerce. Ogden is also known for its many historic buildings, proximity to the Wasatch Mountains, and as the location of Weber State University.

Ogden is a principal city of the Ogden–Clearfield, Utah Metropolitan Statistical Area (MSA), which includes all of Weber, Morgan, Davis, and Box Elder counties. The 2010 Census placed the Metro population at 597,159. In 2010, Forbes rated the Ogden-Clearfield MSA as the 6th best place to raise a family. Ogden has had a sister city relationship to Hof in Germany since 1954.

History

Originally named Fort Buenaventura, Ogden was the first permanent settlement by people of European descent in what is now Utah. It was established by the trapper Miles Goodyear in 1846 about a mile west of where downtown Ogden sits today.

In November 1847, Captain James Brown purchased all the land now comprising Weber County together with some livestock and Fort Buenaventura for $3,000 (equivalent to $ in ). The land was conveyed to Captain Brown in a Mexican Land Grant, this area being at that time a part of Mexico. The settlement was then called Brownsville, after Captain James Brown, but was later named Ogden for a brigade leader of the Hudson's Bay Company, Peter Skene Ogden, who had trapped in the Weber Valley a generation earlier. There is some confusion about which "Ogden" was the first to set foot in the area. A Samuel Ogden traveled through the western United States on an exploration trip in 1818. The site of the original Fort Buenaventura is now a Weber County park.

Ogden is the closest sizable city to the Golden Spike location at Promontory Summit, Utah, where the First transcontinental railroad was joined in 1869. It was known as a major passenger railroad junction owing to its location along major east–west and north–south routes, prompting the local chamber of commerce to adopt the motto, "You can't get anywhere without coming to Ogden." Railroad passengers traveling west to San Francisco from the eastern United States typically passed through Ogden (and not through the larger Salt Lake City to the south). However, Amtrak, the national passenger rail system, no longer serves Ogden. Passengers who want to travel to and from Ogden by rail must travel via FrontRunner commuter rail to Salt Lake City and Provo. Renowned Danish impressionistic writer Hermand Bang died in Ogden in 1912 during a lecture tour in the United States.

In 1972, The Church of Jesus Christ of Latter-day Saints completed construction of and dedicated the Ogden Utah Temple in Ogden. The temple was built to serve the area's large LDS population. In 2010, the LDS Church announced they would renovate the Ogden Temple and the adjacent Tabernacle. The work which began in 2011 includes an update to the exterior, the removal of the Tabernacle's steeple to make the Temple's steeple a main focus, and a new underground parking garage and gardens.  The Temple was rededicated in 2014.

Because Ogden had historically been Utah's second-largest city, it is home to a large number of historic buildings. However, by the 1980s, several Salt Lake City suburbs and Provo had surpassed Ogden in population.

The Defense Depot Ogden Utah operated in Ogden from 1941 to 1997. Some of its  have been converted into a commercial and industrial park called the Business Depot Ogden, colloquially known as "BDO".

Geography

Topography
Ogden is located at  (41.2196, −111.9712), at the foot of the Wasatch Mountains. This is at about the same latitude as Benevent in Campania in southern Italy.

According to the United States Census Bureau, the city has an area of 26.6 square miles (69.0 km2), all land.

The Ogden and Weber Rivers, which originate in the mountains to the east, flow through the city and meet at a confluence just west of the city limits.

Prominent mountain peaks near Ogden include Mount Ogden to the east and Ben Lomond to the north.

Streetscape

From south to west to north, Ogden's neighboring towns are South Ogden, Roy, West Haven, Marriott-Slaterville, Farr West, Pleasant View and North Ogden. The city is - like many others in the USA - characterized by a spacious, street grid with many blocks. The streets are numbered from north to south, which is expressed in the corresponding street names. By extending the numbers with directions ("E" for east and "W" for west) their relative relation to the central point is made clear. In the center of the city, the blocks from Union Station along 25th Street, the north-to-south oriented cross streets are named after former U.S. presidents such as Lincoln Avenue, Grant Avenue, Washington Boulevard, Adams Avenue, Jefferson Avenue, and Madison Avenue. The central connecting street in north–south orientation is Harrison Boulevard. The city area is divided into six districts: in the North End, including West Ogden, Downtown and East Central; in the East, including East Bench and Shadow Valley.

Climate
According to the Köppen climate classification, Ogden experiences either a humid subtropical climate (Cfa) or a humid continental climate (Dfa) depending on which variant of the system is used. Summers are hot and relatively dry, with highs frequently reaching , with a few days per year reaching . Rain is provided in the form of infrequent thunderstorms during summer, usually between late July and mid-September during the height of monsoon season. The Pacific storm season usually lasts from about October through May, with precipitation reaching its peak in spring. Snow usually first occurs in late October or early November, with the last occurring sometime in April. Winters are cool and snowy, with highs averaging  in January.

Demographics

2000 Census 

As of the census of 2000, there were 77,226 people, 27,384 households, and 18,402 families living in the city. The population density was 2,899.2 people per square mile (1,119.3/km2). There were 29,763 housing units at an average density of 1,117.4/sq mi (431.4/km2). The racial makeup of the city was 79.01% White, 2.31% African American, 1.20% Native American, 1.43% Asian, 0.17% Pacific Islander, 12.95% from other races, and 2.93% from two or more races. Hispanic or Latino residents of any race were 23.64% of the population.

There were 27,384 households, out of which 35.2% had children under the age of 18 living with them, 48.4% were married couples living together, 13.1% had a female householder with no husband present, and 32.8% were non-families. 26.2% of all households were made up of individuals, and 9.6% had someone living alone who was 65 years of age or older. The average household size was 2.73 and the average family size was 3.32.

In the city 28.8% of the population was under the age of 18, 14.6% from 18 to 24, 29.0% from 25 to 44, 16.3% from 45 to 64, and 11.3% who were 65 years of age or older. The median age was 29 years. For every 100 females, there were 102.3 males. For every 100 females age 18 and over, there were 100.5 males.

The median income for a household in the city was $34,047, and the median income for a family was $38,950. Males had a median income of $29,006 versus $22,132 for females. The per capita income for the city was $16,632. About 12.6% of families and 16.5% of the population were below the poverty line, including 20.2% of those under age 18 and 9.3% of those age 65 or over.

2010 Census 
As of the census of 2010, there were 82,825 people living in the city. The population density was 2,899.2 people per square mile (1,119.3/km2). There were 29,763 housing units at an average density of 1,117.4/sq mi (431.4/km2). The racial makeup of the city was 75.02% White, 2.24% African American, 1.40% Native American, 1.20% Asian, 0.3% Pacific Islander, 3.7% from other races, and 3.7% from two or more races. Hispanic or Latino of any race were 23.64% of the population.

2017
As of 2017 the largest self-identified ancestry groups in Ogden, Utah were 
 English (15.3%)
 German (9.8%)
 American (6.7%)
 Irish (6.6%)
 Scottish (3.7%)
 Italian (3.4%)
 Danish (2.9%)
 French (2.1%)
 Swedish (1.9%)
 Welsh (1.7%)

Government and politics

Ogden is governed under the mayor-council form of government, in which the full-time mayor serves as an executive while the seven-member part-time council serves as the legislative branch. All these elected officials serve four-year terms, with elections occurring in odd-numbered years and terms beginning in January of even-numbered years.

The mayor is Mike Caldwell, who took office in January 2012. The city council members are Marcia White, Richard Hyer, Bart Blair, Ben Nadolski, Luis Lopez, Angela Choberka, and Ken Richey. Four of the council members represent the city's four municipal districts, while the other three (Lopez, White, and Blair) are elected at-large by voters from the entire city.

The Ogden City government operates on a budget of $190 million per year and employs nearly 600 full-time workers. In addition to providing the usual municipal services, the government promotes business and economic development. The city operates a redevelopment agency (RDA), with the city council acting as the RDA governing board and the mayor as its executive director. The RDA's activity has increased since its establishment in 1969, with tax increment revenues at about $10 million per year and an outstanding debt of over $50 million. Designated redevelopment districts now cover nearly all of Ogden's central business districts, as are Business Depot Ogden and several other industrial areas in the western parts of the city.

Much of the recent political discourse in Ogden has focused on controversial government-sponsored development projects in the downtown area, including the Ogden Eccles Conference Center, Lindquist Field, The Junction, the Ogden River Project, and other proposals that have not moved forward.  A proposed streetcar connecting downtown to Weber State University has attracted considerable attention but only limited support.  A major controversy flared up in 2005–07 when the mayor and many others pushed unsuccessfully for construction of a luxury residential development on public land in Ogden's foothills and a new ski resort in the mountains above the city, to be accessed by a pair of aerial gondolas. Other local political concerns include Ogden's relatively high tax and utility rates, efforts to fight crime, allegations of government corruption, and challenges facing the Ogden City schools.

Federal representation 
Ogden is located in Utah's 1st congressional district. In the 117th United States Congress, Ogden is represented by Blake Moore.

Education

Ogden City School District is the public school district in the city, with its boundaries mirroring the city limits. It operates Ogden High School and Ben Lomond High School.

Weber School District serves areas outside of the city limits, even if they have "Ogden, Utah" postal addresses.

DaVinci Academy of Science and the Arts is an elementary and secondary charter school system.

Utah Schools for the Deaf and the Blind's boarding facility is in the city.

The Roman Catholic Diocese of Salt Lake City operates and/or sponsors Catholic schools including Saint Joseph Catholic High School.

Tertiary
 Weber State University
 Ogden-Weber Applied Technology College
 Stevens–Henager College

Economy

As the principal city of the 2nd largest MSA in Utah, Ogden serves as an economic hub for the northern part of the state. Much of the central city is occupied by offices of federal, state, county, and municipal government entities. The Internal Revenue Service has a large regional facility in Ogden and is the city's largest employer with over 5,000 employees. Other large employers include McKay Dee Hospital, Weber State University, Ogden City School District, Autoliv, Fresenius, and Convergys.

In 2013, Ogden ranked No. 16 on Forbes''' list of the Best Places for Business and Careers.

The western parts of the city have several industrial areas. The largest is Business Depot Ogden, a former Army depot that was restructured to be a 1,000-plus acre business park.

Headquarters
MarketStar –  Sales and marketing company.
ENVE Composites - high-end bicycle components
Autoliv North America – Automotive safety equipment.
Bank of Utah – Banking services.
America First Credit Union – Banking services.
Kadince – Software services.

Transportation

Interstates 15 and 84 serve the city. I-84 runs east–west through the southern suburbs, merging with I-15 near Riverdale. I-15 runs north–south near the city's western edge and provides connections to the rest of the Wasatch Front and beyond. Ogden is served directly by exits 341, 342, 343, and 344. US-89 enters the city from the south, running through the city as Washington Boulevard, which serves as the main street of Ogden. It then continues north to Brigham City. State Route 39 runs east–west through the city as 12th Street, and continues eastward through Ogden Canyon providing access to Pineview Reservoir and the mountain and ski resort town of Huntsville.

The Utah Transit Authority (UTA) operates four bus routes directly between Salt Lake City and Ogden, as well as numerous others that serve Weber and northern Davis counties that connect into either the Ogden Intermodal Hub on the west edge of town or to Weber State University. Ogden is also the source of the two routes that serve Brigham City, the northernmost extension of UTA's bus system. It also has a Greyhound bus stop along a line that runs north–south along I-15. The FrontRunner commuter rail runs between Salt Lake City and the Ogden Intermodal Hub in downtown Ogden.

Amtrak service is provided with a bus connection running to/from Salt Lake City, where there are daily California Zephyr trains west to the Oakland, California area and east to Chicago, Illinois. Amtrak trains do not serve Ogden directly. Historically, Ogden Union Station served as a hub for frequent trains going northwest to Portland, Oregon and Seattle, Washington, and east to Chicago. Amtrak ended the Pioneer in 1997. In the same year, Amtrak ended the Los Angeles to Chicago Desert Wind.Ogden-Hinckley Airport, Utah's busiest municipal airport, is in the southwest portion of the city.  Allegiant Air offered commercial service from Ogden to Phoenix and Mesa, Arizona,  Avelo Airlines served Burbank, California, while Utah Airways offers charter service to many of the West's national parks. As of May 2022, both Allegiant and Avelo ceased service, citing rising costs and dropping ticket sales, in addition to expanded availability of air carriers at Salt Lake International airport just 35 minutes south.

Sites of interest

 Bigelow-Ben Lomond Hotel
 Dee Events Center
 Eccles Avenue Historic District
 Historic 25th Street
 The Ice Sheet Curling: venue used during the 2002 Winter Olympics
 Jefferson Avenue Historic District
 The Junction: retail and residential complex
 Ogden High School
 Ogden Nature Center
 Ogden Utah Temple
 American Can Company of Utah Building Complex
 Ott Planetarium
 Peery's Egyptian Theatre
 Snowbasin Ski Area: alpine skiing venue used during the 2002 Winter Olympics
 Union Station
 Ogden Forest Service Building
 Weber State University

Sports and recreation

The mountains and rivers near Ogden offer many opportunities for outdoor recreation.

An extensive trail system, immediately adjacent to the city's eastern edge, gives residents and visitors immediate access to the foothills of the Wasatch Range. The foothill trails are used for hiking, running, mountain biking, and sometimes snowshoeing and cross-country skiing. Steeper trails climb eastward into the mountains, and many other mountain trails originate within a few miles of the city.  A system of paved urban trails runs along the banks of the Ogden and Weber Rivers.

The quartzite cliffs above Ogden's foothills provide a variety of rock climbing routes. An extensive boulder field in the foothills is one of the most popular bouldering sites in the state. 

On the mountains east of Ogden are three downhill ski areas: Snowbasin, Powder Mountain, and Nordic Valley.  Popular sites for cross-country skiing include Snowbasin and Weber County's North Fork Park.

Kayaking is a popular sport on portions of the Ogden and Weber Rivers.  A developed kayak park lies on the Weber River in the western portion of the city. The reservoirs near Ogden are used for a wide variety of water sports.

Ogden is also home to the minor league baseball team Ogden Raptors of the Pioneer League, the Women's Flat Track Derby Association league Junction City Roller Dolls, the minor-league soccer team Ogden City SC of the USL League Two, and the junior hockey team Ogden Mustangs of the United States Premier Hockey League.

Ogden Stadium houses the annual "Hot Rocking 4th", a motorsports event.

There are several golf courses in the city of Ogden.

Weber State University fields several intercollegiate athletic teams that attract spectators from among residents.  The university is especially known for its basketball team.

Ogden is a satellite venue of the Sundance Film Festival.  A local film festival, now called the Foursite Film Festival, has been held annually since 2004.  Other events of interest include a downtown farmer's market, the Ogden Arts Festival, the Harvest Moon Festival, Ogden Winterfest, and the Ogden Marathon.

Ogden has had two shopping malls. Newgate Mall was built in 1981, and Ogden City Mall a year prior. The latter was torn down and redeveloped as The Junction.

Renown

Two ships in the United States Navy have been named after the City of Ogden; the first, in 1943, and the second, in 1964.

Ogden was the site of the infamous Hi-Fi murders in 1974.

Flying J, the largest retailer of diesel fuel in North America, once had its corporate headquarters in Ogden.

In the media
Ogden is one of five cities featured in the first season of the ABC reality series Emergency Call, which chronicles real-life 9-1-1 calls and the operator-dispatchers who handle them. The Ogden City Mall (which has since been replaced by The Junction (Ogden, Utah) featured in the video of the pop music hit "I Think We're Alone Now" by Tiffany Darwish.

Notable people
 Hal Ashby, Academy Award-winning film director
 Nolan Bushnell, founder of Atari and Chuck E. Cheese's
 Rodney Bagley, co-inventor of the catalytic converter
 Tanoka Beard, basketball player
 Colby Bockwoldt, football player
 Solon Borglum, sculptor
 Fawn M. Brodie, historian
 John Moses Browning, inventor and firearms designer
 Val A. Browning, industrialist, philanthropist, and gun innovator
 Laurence J. Burton, politician, U.S. House of Representatives
 R. D. Call, actor
 Tom Chambers, basketball player
 Les Clark, film animator and director
 Elwood Cooke, tennis player, Wimbledon doubles champion
 Bernard DeVoto, historian
 Kelly Downs, former pitcher for the San Francisco Giants
 Spencer Eccles, philanthropist
 Arthur Guy Empey, adventurer, soldier, writer, actor
 Arnie Ferrin, basketball player
 Byron Foulger, actor
 Tracy Hall, chemist
 William Jefferson Hardin, black legislator
 William Wadsworth Hodkinson, Paramount Pictures founder
 Ashley Jenkins, online personality
 Cecil Jensen, editorial cartoonist
 Edward U. Knowlton, physician and politician
 Damian Lillard, basketball player and NBA Rookie of the Year
 Jeff Lowe, World Class Alpinist
 May Mann, society columnist for The Ogden Standard-Examiner, later Hollywood columnist and celebrity biographer
 J. Willard Marriott, hotel magnate
 Herbert B. Maw, politician, Utah's 8th Governor
 K. Gunn McKay, politician, U.S. House of Representatives
 Joe McQueen, jazz saxophonist
 Wataru Misaka, basketball player
 Blake Moore, politician, U.S. House of Representatives
 Red Nichols, jazz musician, bandleader
 Ray Noorda, business executive
 "The Osmonds": George, Jr. (Virl), Tom, Alan, Wayne, Merrill, Jay, Donny, Marie, entertainers
 Janice Kapp Perry, songwriter
 Heath Satow, artist
 Byron Scott, basketball player and coach
 Brent Scowcroft, politician, United States National Security Advisor
 Sarah Sellers, American long-distance runner
 Richard H. Stallings, politician, U.S. House of Representatives
 Ken St. Andre, game designer
 Brent R. Taylor, politician and United States Army officer
 Minerva Teichert, artist
 E. Parry Thomas, banker
 Olene S. Walker, politician, Utah's 15th Governor
 Ginger Wallace, artist and philanthropist
 Gedde Watanabe, actor

See also

 Amalgamated Sugar Company
 Conoco
 Defense Depot Ogden
 Hi-Fi murders
 International Armoring Corporation
 McKay-Dee Hospital Center
 Standard-Examiner Victim: The Other Side of Murder''

References

External links

 Ogden City web site
 

 
Cities in Utah
Wasatch Front
Cities in Weber County, Utah
County seats in Utah
Populated places established in 1844
Ogden–Clearfield metropolitan area
Articles containing video clips